Stigmella scintillans is a moth of the family Nepticulidae. It is found in North America in Ohio, Michigan and Ontario.

There are usually two generations per year. Second-generation larvae are found in July and early August. These normally overwinter. At times, a third generation occurs, with larvae in late August.

The larvae feed on Crataegus species, including Crataegus mollis. They mine the leaves of their host plant.

External links
Nepticulidae of North America
A taxonomic revision of the North American species of Stigmella (Lepidoptera: Nepticulidae)

Nepticulidae
Moths of North America
Moths described in 1917